Greta Larkins is an Australian television child actress.

Television work

See also

 List of Australians

External links 
 

Year of birth missing (living people)
Place of birth missing (living people)
21st-century Australian actresses

Australian child actresses
Australian television actresses
Living people